Can You Hear the Sound? is the only live album by 24-7 Spyz. It was recorded at CBGB in 1998, just months before the band split up. They would reform five years later with the same lineup, which features founders Jimi Hazel and Rick Skatore along with drummer Tony Lewis.

The album was officially released in two formats: the first as a digital MP3 download on May 9, 2006 followed by a CD release on July 6, 2006.

Track listing
Spyz in da House
Love for Sale
Yeah x 3
Love & Peace
Outta Mind, Outta Time
Spill My Guts
Grandma Dynamite
John Connelly's Theory
New Super Hero Worship
Room #9
Stuntman

Credits
 Jimi Haze: guitar, vocals
 Rick Skatore: bass, vocals
 Tony Lewis: drums
 Produced by Jimi Hazel for Black Angus Productions
 Recorded live at CBGB by Steve Remote for Aura Sonic
 Mixed by Jimi Hazel & Steve Remote
 Mastered by Tom Brick at Absolute Audio

24-7 Spyz albums
1998 live albums